Chuck Rosenthal may refer to:
Chuck Rosenthal (author) or C.P. Rosenthal, American novelist and short story writer
Chuck Rosenthal (district attorney) (Charles A. Rosenthal Jr., born 1946), Republican district attorney

See also
Charles Rosenthal (1875–1954), Australian general and politician